Spagnolo is an Italian surname, literally meaning "Spanish" or "from Spain" and may refer to:

 Duilio Spagnolo (circa 1927–2005), Italian boxer
 Kathleen Mary Spagnolo (1919–2016), American artist
 Renata Spagnolo (born 1989), Italian swimmer

See also
 Forte Spagnolo
 Spagnola
 Spagnoli
 Spagnuolo
Spagnoletto

Italian toponymic surnames
Ethnonymic surnames